Flip Regout (29 July 1915 – 25 May 1993) was a Dutch rower. He competed in two events at the 1936 Summer Olympics.

References

1915 births
1993 deaths
Dutch male rowers
Olympic rowers of the Netherlands
Rowers at the 1936 Summer Olympics
Sportspeople from Maastricht